The Peavey EVH Wolfgang guitar series is the result of the collaboration between guitarist Eddie Van Halen and Hartley Peavey's company, Peavey Electronics.

Peavey included the following endorsement in their advertising: "For as long as I've been playing guitar, I've always been searching for a certain feel and tone...I've experimented by tearing apart and reassembling hundreds of guitars in different ways searching for these qualities. Although I've ruined a lot of great guitars by having done this, I have learned what it takes to make a truly great guitar. The Wolfgang, after years of trial and error, (for me) is that guitar. Our collective efforts in designing the Wolfgang guitar have resulted in a versatile, quality-crafted guitar that feels great, sounds great and is truly inspiring to play. I've already put mine to the test in the studio and on tour and now it's your turn."

The EVH stands for "Eddie Van Halen" while Wolfgang is the name of Eddie Van Halen's son (born in 1991).

History
Since the late 1970s, when Van Halen regularly performed on the Pasadena club scene, and with the release of Van Halen's self-titled debut album, Eddie Van Halen's guitar tone—nicknamed the "Brown Sound" for being full yet distinctively aggressive and articulate—had been widely acclaimed. It immediately set a standard for guitarists all over the world.

To achieve the legendary "Brown Sound", Eddie Van Halen employed a variac to limit the voltage of his Marshall guitar amplifier while still allowing the volume to be at its maximum. He also used a custom-assembled strat-like guitar with a PAF humbucker (taken from a Gibson ES-335) mounted directly to the guitar's body. Van Halen's infamous Frankenstein (a.k.a. the "Frankenstrat") guitar laid the groundwork for most of the custom guitars he played throughout the 1970s and 1980s.

Prior to working with Peavey, Van Halen had worked with and endorsed Charvel, Kramer and Ernie Ball Music Man.

Production of the Peavey EVH Wolfgang began in late 1996 (after a year-long development process) and lasted until 2004, when Eddie Van Halen and Peavey parted amicably. Production of the Wolfgang guitar (along with other Peavey models) occurred in a dedicated Leakesville, MS plant but was moved to Meridian, MS in early 2003.  Van Halen had also developed three amplifiers with Peavey, starting in 1991.

In 2009, Eddie Van Halen announced the release of a new Wolfgang guitar built by Fender but only carrying his own "EVH" brand label.  The newer Wolfgang retains many of exactly the same attributes as its Peavey-built predecessor.

Models and specification
In some sense, the Peavey EVH Wolfgang guitar picked up where the Ernie Ball Music Man EVH model left off, with the prototype design being made by Peavey Design Engineer/Luthier Jim DeCola (an amber quilted top model which still didn't have the Wolfgang headstock shape, but rather a Peavey classic one). On the second prototype, DeCola then developed the final body and headstock designs. Another innovative feature DeCola designed was the recessed truss rod adjustment wheel. Recessing the adjustment wheel into the neck provided a stronger neck joint as well as ease of adjustment like his previous model. This design has since been adopted by Fender, Jackson, Charvel, ESP, Schecter, and many other brands. The body was made of basswood and often had (like its predecessor) a maple cap. This combination is considered by some, such as renowned luthier John Suhr, "the Holy Grail of tone."  The Ernie Ball model, however, used a 1/8" figured maple cap, which is itself less likely to change the overall effect of the tonewood. Peavey Wolfgangs had maple caps ranging from 1/4" to 5/8".
The guitar had a Floyd Rose vibrato system, built by Ping, which lowers pitch only (like the Ernie Ball Music Man EVH model) but added a d-Tuna on the low E-string, a device that allowed that string to be instantly tuned to and from D (a former design of this device, named "The Willie", was filed for patent by Eddie in 1997, but later abandoned in 1998).

Models - Standard carved top is Made in USA, as well as the Special flat top , and flame top Special Deluxe models.

The guitar specifications are:

 Solid (usually 2-piece) basswood body
 Carved maple top (1/4" to 5/8" thick) on selected models (translucent finishes); no top on the Special models
 Bolt-on construction with contoured neck heel, no neck plate
 Unique offset cutaway design
 Birdseye maple neck and fingerboard, oil-finished
 Dual graphite reinforcements and adjustable torsion rod with recessed adjustment wheel
 25 1/2" scale length
 22 jumbo frets (Dunlop 6105)
 15" fingerboard radius
 Locking nut, string retainer bar
 Straight string pull headstock with asymmetrical 3+3 tuning machine configuration
 Precision die-cast tuning machines (based on the Schaller M6L)
 Two Alnico-V custom-wound Peavey humbucking pickups (DC resistance:16.22 kΩ on the neck, and 13.87 kΩ on the bridge) 
 Master volume control (500 kΩ, long split shaft, logarithmic)
 Master tone control (500 kΩ, long split shaft, logarithmic)
 Switchcraft® 3-way toggle switch and output jack
 Peavey/Floyd Rose® licensed, double-locking tremolo assembly (made by Ping)
 D-Tuna device (allows instant drop of low E string to D)
 Chrome-plated hardware finish

Peavey EVH Wolfgang

The original and top-of-the-line model.  Made in the USA.  It featured an arched (carved) top, body binding, two knobs (volume and tone), three-way pickup toggle switch, two Peavey/EVH-designed humbucker pickups, oil-finished bird's eye maple neck and fingerboard with dual graphite reinforcement rods, ten-degree tilt headstock, and Schaller mini M6 tuners (with either pearloid or ivory colored buttons). Two base versions were offered: a solid basswood model and a solid basswood/maple cap model.  (The maple cap was 5/8" before carving.)  Each version could come with either a licensed Floyd Rose tremolo with D-Tuna (d-tuner device) or a tune-o-matic bridge and hard tail piece.  Solid basswood Wolfgangs were offered in gloss ivory and gloss black; solid basswood/maple cap Wolfgangs were offered in various transparent figured maple finishes (sunburst, amber, red, purple, blue, green, cherryburst, and black cherryburst) as well as vintage gold and seafoam green. Very occasionally a rejected maple top was painted either gloss black or gloss ivory.

Peavey EVH Wolfgang Special
Peavey and Eddie Van Halen's attempt to make a "budget" version of the Wolfgang that didn't compromise quality in parts or craftsmanship.  Made in the USA in 1998.  It featured a flat top, one knob (volume), three-way pickup toggle switch, two Peavey/EVH-designed humbucker pickups, licensed Floyd Rose tremolo with D-Tuna (d-tuner device), oil-finished hard rock maple neck and fingerboard with dual graphite reinforcement rods, straight headstock, and chrome tuners.  Two base versions were offered: a solid basswood model and a solid basswood/maple cap model.  (The maple cap was 1/4".)  Each version could come with either a licensed Floyd Rose tremolo with D-Tuna (d-tuner device) or a tune-o-matic bridge and hard tailpiece.  Solid basswood Wolfgang Specials were offered in gloss ivory, gloss black, vintage gold, gloss purple, and sunburst; solid basswood/maple cap Wolfgangs were offered in various transparent figured maple finishes (amber, red, purple, green, sunburst, and black cherryburst).  Very occasionally a rejected maple top was painted gloss black.

Peavey EVH Wolfgang & Wolfgang Special (Custom Shop)
The Peavey EVH Wolfgang Custom Shop operated from January 2002 to December 2004.  It was run by four highly talented craftsman, each with a different area of specialty.  The Custom Shop launched with a contest held via Van Halen's official website.  Twelve unique Wolfgangs were given away throughout 2002—one every month.

Approximately 285 Custom Shop guitars were produced in Leakesville, of which 92 of these were made to fill specific orders while the rest were built for the "Wolfgang Vault".

Another 130 specific customer orders were produced in Meridian after mid-2003 as well as another 70 guitars, many of which are not really true Customs as they were using up remaining materials inventory. Some guitars where the only upgrade is a rosewood fretboard is technically called a Custom Shop, but most really are not. Eddie didn't want the production guitars to have rosewood fretboards so the only way they could produce them like this was to call them Custom Shop guitars.

Thus, approximately 500 Custom Shop guitars were built from 2002 through 2004, some 220 of them being specific customer orders (Approximately 50 of those were ordered and/or purchased by guitar collector Geoff Knapp.  These and many more are pictured at his website, Rock'N Roll Weekend).

Peavey had an area at their website for people to "build" (and order) their own Custom Shop guitars. The basic options that anyone could select were; the body wood: top wood; fretboard wood; fretboard inlays; bridge type; hardware color; top color or graphic and matching/standard headstock. The body wood options were basswood (standard), alder, ash, mahogany, and even koa or korina which weren't standard options. Bridge options were a stop tail bridge or a Floyd Rose Tremolo system in chrome (standard), gold or black. The Special models came with the birdseye (not hard rock) maple neck, which was an upgrade from a production special. For the fretboard you could select Birdseye (standard), Rosewood or Ebony. For the inlays they had pearl or black dots (standard), EVH Blocks, Tribal Flames, Skulls or no inlays at all. For the top you could select flame maple (standard), quilted maple, koa or none (solid body construction). There were about 30 colors to choose from including graphics and a custom graphic option.

Peavey EVH Wolfgang Special EXP
Offered from 2002 to 2004, the Peavey EVH Wolfgang Special EXP was a Korean-made version of the Wolfgang.  It contained no markings to differentiate it from USA models, but there were several deviations.  The Wolfgang Special EXP had a 1/20" quilt maple veneer top and came in four transparent colors: amber, maroon, blue, and sunburst.  The body was made of solid basswood and had a masked "faux" binding.  Like the USA Wolfgang Special it featured a flat top, one knob (volume), three-way pickup toggle switch, Peavey/EVH-designed humbucker pickups like USA models, licensed Floyd Rose tremolo with D-Tuna (d-tuner device), hard rock maple neck and fingerboard, straight headstock, and Grover mini tuners (a feature unique to this model).  Some aspects of the Wolfgang Special EXP were different to its USA counterparts: the neck had no graphite reinforcement rods and was finished with a satin poly. 
A hard tail version was not offered.

Specifications details and singularities (pickups, switching, vibrato unit, colours)
The pickups on the US-made guitars were manufactured by Peavey and, due to the fact that they used different enamel wire types, the neck pickup actually had a higher impedance than the bridge one (approximately 16.22 kΩ on the neck and 13.87 kΩ on the bridge one), which is uncommon.
The EXP models (made in Korea) had pickups made to these specs, but not made in the US.

The 3-way switch works in an unconventional way, to the preference of Eddie Van Halen (similar to rotating a Les Paul switch 180 degrees), who mentioned needing to faster switch to the bridge position for soloing. Hence, the "up" position enables the bridge pickup whereas the "down" position enables the neck pickup; the middle position enables both pickups connected in parallel.

The vibrato unit was made by Ping to the specifications given by Peavey (string spacing: 10.8mm, string spread: 54mm or 2 7/8", stud spacing: 74mm or 2 15/16", post insert size: 8mm, radius 355mm or 14", brass block depth: 33mm).
On the EXP models, a low-budget version built in Korea was installed, more similar to a Schaller unit.

Two solid finishes which had maple tops (seafoam green and solid gold) on the Standard models gained some preference due to their exquisite looks. In Jim DeCola's words: "The first batch of gold guitars had a different shade of gold than most others as the paint vendor changed. Maybe the first 50 or so. The finishing department blamed a mistake on the paint vendor who supplied the gold and consequently changed the supplier after about 50 or so guitars. The original gold had a warmer, more Gibson bronze cast compared to the following production gold guitars."

There are a few prototype colours on serial production guitars, with as low as 1 guitar with a certain colour, experiments that Peavey made while in production. One of the examples of this is a dark gloss oxblood finish with a black binding, now owned by an Austin guitar dealer (bearing the patent number but no serial). Some of these had black or gold hardware.

Serial numbers
USA-built Peavey Wolfgangs typically had serial numbers that started with "91" followed by six more digits.  Late-run USA Wolfgangs had serial numbers that started with "50" or "51". A very few prototype models had serial numbers that started with "1". Though Peavey Wolfgang owners have often sought to find a corroboration in the serial numbers of their guitars and the year in which each was built (similar to the system Gibson uses), there was no such information contained in the serial numbers.  There was also no code specific to Custom Shop models.

Peavey Wolfgang serial numbers were stamped on the back of the headstock between the tuners.  Eddie Van Halen's signature and the headstock patent number were both branded just below the serial number.  Early Wolfgang models (1996–1998) contained the term "Pat. Pend." in place of the patent number.  Korean model EXP Wolfgang Specials had serial numbers printed in black on the back of the headstock.

Peavey HP Special
Shortly after the split with Eddie Van Halen, Peavey released the HP Special model (HP stands for Hartley Peavey, although the model was initially supposed to be named Carina) in 2005, with both American and Asian versions, a guitar that encompassed many of the characteristics of the Wolfgang (basswood body with optional contoured maple top, bolt-on maple neck with maple fingerboard, etc.), but was somewhat of a departure from the collaboration with the guitarist - an H-S-H pickup configuration option, a 5-bolt neck joint, and the headstock shape change, even if the Wolfgang headstock patent remained with Peavey.

Work with Fender - the Charvel Art Series and the EVH brand
In his last times with Peavey, Eddie Van Halen began working with Charvel to produce replicas of three of his striped guitar models, the Charvel EVH Art Series, in black and white, yellow and black, and also the most common red, white, and black color scheme.
During the Van Halen 2004 Tour, the guitarist played a different custom striped Charvel Art Series in a few songs of each concert, later autographing and auctioning them on eBay.

In 2007, under the supervision of master-builder Chip Ellis, a single run of 300 official replicas of his original Frankenstein guitar were made available by Fender under the EVH brand, in strict collaboration with Eddie Van Halen. The guitars were priced at $25,000, having a massive demand upon their arrival to the market.

After the 2007-08 Tour, and once again under the supervision of Chip Ellis, the evolution of the Wolfgang within the Fender group became available to the public, with the EVH Wolfgang® (in 2008) and the EVH Wolfgang® Special (in 2010), both sporting the "bottle opener" shape, which is owned by Eddie Van Halen, unlike the old Peavey headstock. This was also designed by Jim DeCola who added Eddie and Hartley Peavey's names to the patent and then assigned it to Eddie so he could have ownership.
The guitar inherits many of the Peavey characteristics, namely the woods, overall design, and pickups. Regarding these, Jim DeCola added: "I worked at Fender (Nashville) for 11 years after Peavey (...). They picked my brain a little before I realized they were trying to lure EVH away. I already discussed what I did with the pickups casually to coworkers. After the guitar was released, I got copies of the pickup specs and blueprints. They are the same specs.".

An amplifier series - the EVH 5150 III - and several instrument accessories and merchandise soon followed, all under the EVH brand.

Peavey HP2
In July 2017, during the Summer NAMM Show in Nashville, Peavey announced the release of the HP2 model, an instrument which has exactly the same appearance and specifications as the discontinued Wolfgang, with minor differences such as the inclusion of a push/pull switch in the Tone knob (for a split-coil connection), the removal of the EVH Wolfgang inscription as well as the D-Tuna device, and the announcement of left-handed models as soon as production begins; the company also hinted at Special and Custom Shop models.

References

External links
 Peavey Instruments
 The EVH Art Guitar Shop
 EVH Brand Guitars, Amps and Musical Products.

EVH Wolfgang